Benjamin Brenner (August 3, 1903 – May 30, 1970) was an American lawyer and politician from New York.

Life
He was born on August 3, 1903.

Brenner was a member of the New York State Assembly in 1938, elected in November 1937 on the American Labor and City Fusion tickets in the 2nd assembly district of Brooklyn. He was defeated when running for re-election in 1938 on the Republican and American Labor tickets.

On May 10, 1939, Brenner was appointed by Mayor Fiorello LaGuardia to the Municipal Court (8th D.) to fill the vacancy caused by the appointment of Murray Hearn to the City Court. In November 1939, he was defeated when running for a full term, and left the bench at the end of the year.

In 1940, he ran in the 8th district for Congress but was defeated by Democrat Donald L. O'Toole.

In July 1944, he was elected Chairman of the Liberal Party in Brooklyn.

On September 27, 1948, he was appointed by Mayor William O'Dwyer as a City Magistrate.

He was a justice of the New York Supreme Court from 1953 to 1969. In September 1960, he was nominated on the Liberal ticket for the New York Court of Appeals; but declined to run. At the end of 1969, he resigned from the bench due to ill health, and moved to Fort Lauderdale, Florida.

He died on May 30, 1970, in Memorial Hospital in Hollywood, Florida, of heart disease.

Sources

1903 births
1970 deaths
Members of the New York State Assembly
American Labor Party politicians
Politicians from Brooklyn
New York Supreme Court Justices
Liberal Party of New York politicians
20th-century American judges
20th-century American politicians